Craig Thomas McKnight (born 6 September 1969) is a Scottish former first-class cricketer.

McKnight was born in September 1969 at Bellshill, Lanarkshire. He was educated at Hutcheson's Grammar School, before matriculating to the University of Strathclyde. A club cricketer for Poloc Cricket Club, McKnight made a single appearance for Scotland in first-class cricket against Ireland at Edinburgh in 1990. Playing in the Scottish side as a slow left-arm orthodox bowler, he took the wickets of Mark Cohen, Alan Lewis and Noel Nelson in the Irish first innings, finishing the innings with figures of 3 for 48. In the Scottish first innings, he was dismissed without scoring by Garfield Harrison. Prior to his debut for Scotland, McKnight was associated with English county side Nottinghamshire, playing several second eleven matches for them.

References

External links
 

1969 births
Living people
Sportspeople from Bellshill
People educated at Hutchesons' Grammar School
Alumni of the University of Strathclyde
Scottish cricketers